Årnäs, Sweden may refer to:
Årnäs, Halland
Årnäs, Värmland
Årnäs, Västra Götaland

See also
Ärnäs, Sweden (disambiguation)
Arnäsvall in  Västernorrland, Sweden